Baker Valley Unified School District is a public school district based in San Bernardino County, California, United States.

References

External links
 

School districts in San Bernardino County, California